How Poets Wait for a Miracle is a 2016 Czech comedy film directed by Dušan Klein and written by Ladislav Pecháček. The final installment in the "Poets hexalogy", the title is preceded by How the World Is Losing Poets (1982), How Poets Are Losing Their Illusions (1985), How Poets Are Enjoying Their Lives (1988), Konec básníků v Čechách (1993), and Jak básníci neztrácejí naději (2004). The film stars Pavel Kříž and David Matásek as two lifelong friends, now in their fifties and still looking for love and the perfect job, and now also dealing with a child.

Synopsis
Štěpán's wife, Anička, with whom he fell in love in the last film, has died and left him as a single dad and a 50-year-old hypochondriac. His two close friends, Kendy and Karas, help him raise his son, Štěpán Jr. Kendy has decided he is done directing commercials; instead, he wants to try his hand at making a feature film. Štěpán works as the deputy head of the hospital ward and fights constantly with Vendulka, the new director. His attractive neighbour, Zuzana, a photographer, becomes his new love interest.

Cast and characters

 Pavel Kříž as Štěpán Šafránek
 David Matásek as Kendy
 Filip Antonio as Štěpán Šafránek Jr.
 Lukáš Vaculík as Karas
 Linda Rybová as Zuzana
 Emily Laura Hassmannová as Vanesa / Eva Rybářová
 Josef Somr as Prof. Ječmen
 Eva Jeníčková as Vendulka
 Denisa Nesvačilová as Majka
 Tereza Brodská as Ute
 Eva Holubová as head nurse Vojtěcha
 Nela Boudová as schoolteacher, Karas's girlfriend
 Miroslav Táborský as Hanousek
 Kateřina Táborská as Hanousková

 Pavel Zedníček as Písařík
 Martin Kraus as Písařík Jr.
 Oldřich Navrátil as Nádeníček
 Václav Svoboda as Venoš Pastyřík
 Tomáš Töpfer as Dr. Sahulák
 František Ringo Čech as lifeguard Bouchal
 Markéta Hrubešová as Ivetka
 Henrieta Hornácková as assistant Vycpálková
 Jiří Strach as hotel porter
 Jiří Lábus as old man
 Rudolf Hrušínský Jr. as old man
 Josef Abrhám as old man
 Libuše Švormová as nurse
 Leoš Mareš as doctor

References

External links
 

2016 films
2016 comedy films
Czech comedy films
Czech sequel films
2010s Czech-language films